Tall Mohammad (also Romanized as Tall Moḩammad, Tal-e Moḩammad, Tall-e Moḩammad, and Tal Moḩammad) is a village in Padena-ye Olya Rural District, Padena District, Semirom County, Isfahan Province, Iran. At the 2006 census, its population was 374, in 81 families.

References 

Populated places in Semirom County